Sebastiano Rossi (died 1542) was a Roman Catholic prelate who served as Bishop of Caorle (1538–1542).

Biography
On 30 October 1538, Sebastiano Rossi was appointed during the papacy of Pope Paul III as Bishop of Caorle.
He served as Bishop of Caorle until his death in 1542.

References

External links and additional sources
 (for Chronology of Bishops) 
 (for Chronology of Bishops) 

16th-century Italian Roman Catholic bishops
Bishops appointed by Pope Paul III
1542 deaths